The Long Now Foundation, established in 1996, is an American non-profit organization based in San Francisco that seeks to start and promote a long-term cultural institution. It aims to provide a counterpoint to what it views as today's "faster/cheaper" mindset and to promote "slower/better" thinking. The Long Now Foundation hopes to "creatively foster responsibility" in the framework of the next 10,000 years. In a manner somewhat similar to the Holocene calendar, the foundation uses 5-digit dates to address the Year 10,000 problem (e.g., by writing the current year "0" rather than "").

Projects
The foundation has several ongoing projects, including a 10,000-year clock known as the Clock of the Long Now, the Rosetta Project, the Long Bet Project, the open source Timeline Tool (also known as Longviewer), the Long Server and a monthly seminar series.

Clock of the Long Now

The purpose of the Clock of the Long Now is to construct a timepiece that will operate with minimum human intervention for ten millennia. It is to be constructed of durable materials, to be easy to repair, and to be made of largely valueless materials in case knowledge of the clock is lost or it is deemed to be of no value to an individual or possible future civilization; in this way it is hoped that the Clock will not be looted or destroyed. Its power source (or sources) should be renewable but similarly unlootable. A prototype of a potential final clock candidate was activated on December 31, 1999, and is currently on display at the Science Museum in London. The Foundation is currently building the Clock of the Long Now in Van Horn, Texas.

Rosetta Project

The Rosetta Project is an effort to preserve all languages that have a high likelihood of extinction over the period from 2000 to 2100. These include many languages whose native speakers number in the thousands or fewer. Other languages with many more speakers are considered by the project to be endangered because of the increasing importance of English as an international language of commerce and culture. Samples of such languages are to be inscribed onto a disc of nickel alloy three inches (7.62 cm) across. A Version 1.0 of the disc was completed on November 3, 2008.

Long Bet Project
The Long Bet Project was created by The Long Now Foundation to propose and keep track of bets on long-term events and stimulate discussion about the future. The Long Now Foundation describes The Long Bet Project as a "public arena for enjoyably competitive predictions, of interest to society, with philanthropic money at stake." One example bet would be on whether people will regularly fly on pilotless aircraft by 2030.

Bets that were resolved in 2010 included predictions about peak oil, print on demand, modem obsolescence, and commercially available 100-qubit quantum computers.

Seminars about long-term thinking
In November 2003, The Long Now Foundation began a series of monthly seminars about long-term thinking (SALT) with a lecture by Brian Eno. The seminars are held in the San Francisco Bay Area and have focused on long-term policy and thinking, scenario planning, singularity and the projects of the foundation. The seminars are available for download in various formats from The Long Now Foundation. They are intended to "nudge civilization toward making long-term thinking automatic and common". Topics have included preserving environmental resources, the deep past and deep future of the sciences and the arts, human life extension, the likelihood of an asteroid strike in the future, SETI, and the nature of time.

Long Now Foundation debate format

As part of the seminar series, there are occasionally debates on areas of long term concern, such as synthetic biology or "historian vs futurist on human progress".

The point of Long Now debates is not win-lose. The point is public clarity and deep understanding, leading to action graced with nuance and built-in adaptivity, with long-term responsibility in mind.

In operation, "There are two debaters, Alice and Bob. Alice takes the podium, makes her argument. Then Bob takes her place, but before he can present his counter-argument, he must summarize Alice's argument to her satisfaction — a demonstration of respect and good faith. Only when Alice agrees that Bob has got it right is he permitted to proceed with his own argument — and then, when he's finished, Alice must summarize it to his satisfaction."

Mutual understanding is enforced by a reciprocal requirement to describe the other's argument to their satisfaction, with the goal being more understanding after the event than there was beforehand.

The Interval

Opened in June 2014, The Interval was designed as social space in the foundation's Fort Mason facility in San Francisco. The purpose of The Interval is to have a public space where people can come together to discuss ideas and topics related to long-term thinking, as well as provide a venue for a variety of Long Now events. The Interval includes lounge furniture, artifacts from the foundation's projects, a library, audio/video equipment, and a bar serving tea and coffee during the day, and cocktails during the night.  In October 2014 The Interval was named by Thrillist as one of the best new bars in America.

PanLex
PanLex is a linguistic project whose stated mission is to overcome language barriers to human rights, information, and opportunities. Started in 2004 at the University of Washington’s Turing Center, the project sought to build software that would enable all humans to use their native language to share information, ideas, and emotions with the rest of the world. This research produced a lexical database (TransGraph) designed to support panlingual translation, and a more powerful extension of it (PanDictionary) based on intelligent automated inference. After this work demonstrated the feasibility of the concept, the PanDictionary became the PanLex Database, and PanLex has continued to enlarge, enrich, and modify it by consulting multilingual dictionary and dictionary-like sources. In 2012, PanLex became a project of The Long Now Foundation.

In popular culture
Neal Stephenson's science fiction novel Anathem was partly inspired by the author's involvement with the Clock of the Long Now project. As a result of Brian Eno's work on the clock project, an album entitled January 07003 / Bell Studies for The Clock of The Long Now was released in 2003. English songwriter Owen Tromans released a single entitled "Long Now", inspired by the foundation, in 2013.

Board members
The Board of Directors of The Long Now Foundation :

See also
 All Species Foundation
 Big History
 Deep time 
 The Knowledge: How to Rebuild Our World from Scratch (book)
 Longue durée
 Longplayer
Longtermism
 Open Source Ecology
 Pioneer plaque
 Seven generation sustainability
 Voyager Golden Record
 Memory of Mankind

References

External links

 
 The Rosetta Project
 The Long Bets Foundation
 A Look at Accountable Predictions Radio feature about The Long Bet Project, from the U.S. public radio program 'Marketplace'
 "Buffett's big bet: The celebrated investor wagers a tidy sum that even carefully chosen hedge funds won't return more than the market over time" (Fortune Magazine on a Longbets bet)
 PanLex

 
Non-profit organizations based in California
501(c)(3) organizations
1996 establishments in California
Brian Eno
Organizations established in 1996